The Economic Intelligence Council is the apex forum overseeing government agencies responsible for economic intelligence and combating economic offences in India. The Council is also the apex of 18 regional economic intelligence committees, and is part of the Union Ministry of Finance. It was formed in 1990.

Functions
The Economic Intelligence Council is responsible for coordination, strategy and information-sharing amongst the government agencies responsible for intelligence and control of economic offences such as smuggling, money laundering tax evasion and fraud. The Council also advises the Finance Minister and the Union Council of Ministers on laws regulating the financial sector and fighting economic crimes.

Members
The chairperson of the Economic Intelligence Council is the Finance Minister of India. Its chief members include the Governor of the Reserve Bank of India (RBI), Chairman of the Securities and Exchange Board of India (SEBI) and the Directors of the Central Bureau of Investigation (CBI), Narcotics Control Bureau (NCB) and the Directorate of Revenue Intelligence (DRI). Members from the Finance Ministry include the Secretaries of Finance, Revenue, Company Affairs and the Additional Secretary of Banking.

The Central Board of Indirect Taxes and   Customs is represented by its chairman and its members responsible for the Excise/GST, Customs and Anti-Smuggling departments. Such as the Directors Of Directorate of GST Intelligence (DGGI) and Directorate of Revenue Intelligence (DRI).                              The Central Board of Direct Taxes is represented by its chairman and the member for investigation. Other department heads include the Directors of the Directorate General of Economic Enforcement.

 The Deputy Director General of the Central Economic Intelligence Bureau serves as the Council's secretary. Special invitees include the director of the Intelligence Bureau (IB) and the Directorate General of Foreign Trade.

Regional committees

Under the Economic Intelligence Council are 30Regional Economic Intelligence Committee (India). The committees are constituted of a wide range of agencies and officials responsible for the designated regions.

References

Indian intelligence agencies
Ministry of Finance (India)
Financial crime prevention
Tax evasion in India
1990 establishments in India
Government agencies established in 1990